Henry Brandon, 2nd Duke of Suffolk (18 September 1535 – 14 July 1551), styled Lord Henry Brandon before 1545, was an English nobleman, the son of Charles Brandon, 1st Duke of Suffolk, by his fourth wife, Catherine Willoughby.

His father had previously been married to Mary Tudor, sister of King Henry VIII. Following the deaths of Mary and their son, Henry Brandon, 1st Earl of Lincoln, Charles had married Catherine, Lady Willoughby de Eresby, who had been the intended bride of the elder Henry.

In 1541, Lord Henry Brandon and his younger brother Lord Charles Brandon had their miniatures painted by Hans Holbein the Younger.

Lord Brandon succeeded his father as 2nd Duke of Suffolk on 22 August 1545. He and his younger brother were both minors and continued their education by going up to St John's College, Cambridge. During an epidemic of the sweating sickness, the two youths died, Suffolk first and his younger brother about an hour later. They died at the Bishop of Lincoln's Palace in the village of Buckden, near Huntingdon, Huntingdonshire, where they had fled in an attempt to escape the epidemic.

A solemn celebration of the funerals of the two Dukes, called a 'Month's Mind', was held on 22 September 1551 with all the funeral equipment in duplicate. The humanist intellectuals Thomas Wilson and Walter Haddon wrote a life of Suffolk and his younger brother shortly after their death.

Further reading
The Life and Career of Charles Brandon, Duke of Suffolk, c. 1484-1545, by S. J. Gunn.
Catherine Willoughby, by Evelyn Read.

References

|-

1535 births
1551 deaths
202
Alumni of St John's College, Cambridge
Henry
Willoughby family
16th-century English nobility
Deaths from sweating sickness
Royalty and nobility who died as children